Kohrs is a surname of German origin. Notable people with the surname include:

Bob Kohrs (born 1958), American defensive back and linebacker
Conrad Kohrs (1835–1920), American cattle rancher and politician
Manfred Kohrs (born 1957), German tattooist and conceptual artist
Randy Kohrs, American multi-instrumentalist

References

Surnames of German origin